Lucy Taylor Allen (born November 29, 1941) is a former Democratic member of the North Carolina General Assembly.

Political career 
She represented the state's forty-ninth House district, including constituents in Franklin, Halifax and Nash counties, from her first election in 2002 through 2010. Allen is a former teacher from Louisburg, North Carolina, and served as the mayor of Louisburg (1985–2001). From 1972–1980, Allen served as a member of the Franklin County Board of Education.  Allen is an Episcopalian.

Allen also served as a member of the Franklin County Board of Education, Mayor of Louisburg, North Carolina, a member of the Electricities Board of Directors, and was President of the League of Municipalities. During her time in the assembly she was Chairman of the Environment Committee for two terms and served as a co-chair of the Environmental Review Commission.

In 2010, Allen resigned from the legislature to accept an appointment to the state Utilities Commission, effective April 12. John May was appointed as her replacement in the House.

References

External links

American Episcopalians
Mayors of places in North Carolina
School board members in North Carolina
Democratic Party members of the North Carolina House of Representatives
Women state legislators in North Carolina
Living people
Episcopalians from North Carolina
People from Louisburg, North Carolina
21st-century American politicians
21st-century American women politicians
1941 births